Qanyaruq or Qonyaruq, also rendered as Qaniaruq or Qanyaroq or Guniarukh, may refer to:
 Qanyaruq-e Bala
 Qanyaruq-e Pain